Pasta chi Vrocculi Arriminati is a pasta dish originating from Palermo, Sicily. It generally consists of a long pasta like spaghetti or bucatini, cauliflower, onion, raisins, anchovies, pine nuts, saffron, red chili, and breadcrumbs. Traditionally it was made with bucatini. The name "arriminati" means mixed and refers to the process of mixing until the cauliflower forms a creamy sauce.

See also

List of Sicilian dishes
List of pasta dishes

References

Cuisine of Sicily
Palermitan cuisine
Pasta dishes